ModelSim is a multi-language environment by Siemens (previously developed by Mentor Graphics,) for simulation of hardware description languages such as VHDL, Verilog and SystemC, and includes a built-in C debugger. ModelSim can be used independently, or in conjunction with Intel Quartus Prime, PSIM, Xilinx ISE or Xilinx Vivado. Simulation is performed using the graphical user interface (GUI), or automatically using scripts.

Editions
Mentor HDL simulation products are offered in multiple editions, such as ModelSim PE and Questa Sim.

Questa Sim is used in large multi-million gate designs, and is supported on Microsoft Windows and Linux, in 32-bit and 64-bit architectures.

ModelSim can also be used with MATLAB/Simulink, using Link for ModelSim. Link for ModelSim is a fast bidirectional co-simulation interface between Simulink and ModelSim. For such designs, MATLAB provides a numerical simulation toolset, while ModelSim provides tools to verify the hardware implementation & timing characteristics of the design.

Language support
ModelSim uses a unified kernel for simulation of all supported languages, and the method of debugging embedded C code is the same as VHDL or Verilog.

ModelSim and Questa Sim products enable simulation, verification and debugging for the following languages:
VHDL
Verilog
Verilog 2001
SystemVerilog
PSL
SystemC

See also
 Intel Quartus Prime
 Icarus Verilog
 List of HDL simulators
 NCSim
 Verilator
 Xilinx ISE
 Xilinx Vivado

References

External links
 

Computer-aided design software
Electronic design automation software
Digital electronics